Creamy salmon soup is a common dish in Finland and other Nordic countries. It consists of salmon fillets, boiled potatoes, carrots and leeks. The soup is served hot, with some dill. There is a discussion about the ingredients of the dish, whether milk should be used as an ingredient. Milk may be substituted for cream, however it must be whole milk.

See also
 Finnish cuisine
 List of fish dishes
 List of soups

References

Finnish cuisine
Fish and seafood soups